A flying saucer is an unidentified flying object (UFO) that is saucer-shaped. The term may also generally refer to any UFO.

Flying saucer(s) may also refer to:

Books 
 The Flying Saucers Are Real, by Donald Keyhoe (1950)
Flying Saucers from Outer Space, by Donald Keyhoe (1953)
The Flying Saucer Mystery, Nancy Drew (1980)
 Military flying saucers, about a number of aircraft that have been proposed over the years

Periodicals 
 Flying Saucers (magazine)

Films 
 The Flying Saucer, science fiction by Mikel Conrad (1950)
 Earth vs. the Flying Saucers, science fiction by Fred Sears (1956)
 Flying Saucer Daffy, Three Stooges (1958)
 Flying Saucer Rock'n'Roll, science fiction spoof (1997)
 Summer of the Flying Saucer, Irish family film (2008)

Music 
 The Crew of the Flying Saucer, Mike Watt band
 "The Flying Saucer" (song), Buchanan and Goodman record (1956)
 "The Flying Saucer Goes West", Dickie Goodman record (1958)
 "Presidential Interview (Flying Saucer '64)", Dickie Goodman record (1964)
 Flyin' Saucers Rock and Roll, record by Billy Lee Riley (1957)
 Flying Saucer Attack, David Pearce band from Bristol, England
 "Flying Saucer Dudes", song by Béla Fleck and the Flecktones (1991)
 Flying Saucer Blues, Peter Case album (2000)

Spacecraft 
 British Rail flying saucer, proposed by Charles Osmond Frederick
 Flying Saucer Working Party, UK Ministry of Defence study
 Kissinger-Crookes Flying Saucer, homebuilt glider (1958)
 Nazi flying saucers, various stories or claims
 Ralph Horton flying saucer crash, Ralph Horton's farm, Fulton County, Georgia (1952)

TV episodes 
 "The Flying Saucer", The Beverly Hillbillies 
 "The Flying Saucer", Maude 
 "Flying Sauces", Home Improvement 
 "The Joker's Flying Saucer", Batman

Other 
 Fatman the Human Flying Saucer, comic book superhero (1960s)
 Flying saucer (confectionery), sherbet-filled confectionery
 Flying Saucer Tour Vol. 1, comedy album by Bill Hicks (2002)
 Flying Saucers (attraction), Disneyland (1961-1966)
 KULT: The Temple of Flying Saucers, Exxos game (1989)
 Flying Saucer (library), a Java programming library
 The Flying Saucer, Sharjah, a Brutalist building restored as a community art space

See also 
 Flying disc 
 Flying Flapjack 
 Flying Pancake 
 UFO (disambiguation)
 Unidentified flying object (disambiguation)